Şefkat Tepe is a Turkish action, military, drama and crime series which aired on November 6, 2010. The series is set in 1997. The primary cast includes Mert Kılıç, Aslıhan Güner, Dilara Büyükbayraktar and Mehmet Korhan Fırat.

External links

Turkish television series
2010 Turkish television series debuts
Turkish drama television series
Television shows set in Istanbul
Television series produced in Istanbul